Sketchup is a West German comedy television series which aired on ARD between 1984 and 1986. A sketch show, it enjoyed popular success at the time of its broadcast. A revival series was broadcast in 1997 with a new cast, but it did not recapture the success of the original.

Main cast
 Diether Krebs
 Iris Berben 
 Beatrice Richter

References

Bibliography
Screen International: The international film & television directory, Volume 3. EMAP Media Information, 1993.

External links
 

1984 German television series debuts
1986 German television series endings
1997 German television series debuts
1997 German television series endings
1980s comedy television series
1990s comedy television series
German-language television shows